The discography of Tame Impala, a psychedelic rock project by the Australian musician Kevin Parker, consists of four studio albums, two live albums, four extended plays, twenty one singles and several collaborations and compilation appearances.

Tame Impala were formed in Perth in 2007 after Parker's home recordings on Myspace drew attention from the independent record label Modular Recordings. The band signed to Modular among a bidding war and the band's eponymous debut EP was released in September 2008 to national acclaim; it topped the Australian Independent Record Labels Chart and peaked at number 10 on the Australian Singles Chart, as well as receiving widespread positive reviews and leading the band to appear on Triple Js Hottest 100 list at the end of the year. Tame Impala's debut studio album, Innerspeaker, was released in May 2010 and received international acclaim, as well as peaking at number 4 on the Australian Albums Chart and placing in the national charts in Belgium, the Netherlands and the United Kingdom. Innerspeaker was subsequently nominated for three Australian Recording Industry Association (ARIA) Music Awards, certified Gold by the ARIA and won the best-album accolade at both the Rolling Stone Awards and J Awards in 2011.

Lonerism, Tame Impala's second studio album, was released in October 2012. The album received "universal acclaim" according to Metacritic, and placed in the top 40 in Australia, Belgium, Ireland, New Zealand, the UK and the United States. The album's three supporting singles—"Elephant", "Feels Like We Only Go Backwards" and "Mind Mischief"—were moderate successes, particularly in the US where "Elephant" peaked at number 8 on the Billboard Alternative Songs chart. Lonerism was voted number one on several publications' year-end album lists, including NME, Loud and Quiet and FILTER. Like Innerspeaker, Lonerism received best-album accolade at the Rolling Stone and J Awards; the album has since been certified Gold in Australia and Silver in the UK. It also garnered a Grammy Award nomination for Best Alternative Music Album at the 56th Annual Grammy Awards.

Tame Impala's third studio album, Currents, was released 17 July 2015. Their fourth studio album The Slow Rush was released on 14 February 2020.

Kevin Parker also produces music for different artists under his own name.

Albums

Studio albums

Live albums

Extended plays

Singles

As lead artist

As featured artist

Promotional singles

Other charted and certified songs

Music videos

Guest appearances

Remixes

Songwriting & production discography

Albums

Tracks

Instrumentation and technical credits

Notes

References

External links

Discographies of Australian artists
Rock music group discographies
Discography